During 1999 and 2000, Burger King and the Consumer Product Safety Commission held an effort to recall plastic containers resembling Poké Balls in the United States after it was determined they presented a suffocation hazard.

Background
Burger King released a set of 57 Pokémon toys in a $22 million Pokémon: The First Movie promotion, which were contained within round Poké Ball containers measuring from 2.75 and 3 inches in diameter. Burger King distributed the Poké balls inside big kids meals and regular kids meals, and it was to last for eight weeks from early November through December 1999. The containers ranged in color from red and white to hot pink. The containers were made by Equity Marketing, Inc. in Los Angeles. The container could be opened by pulling the two halves of it apart. Ten days into the promotion, Burger King North America President Paul Clayton ran full-page newspaper ads apologizing for shortages.

Suffocation risk and recall 

On December 11, 1999, a 13-month-old girl in Sonora, California, suffocated on the container, and was found deceased in her playpen with half of the ball covering her nose and mouth. Following her death, the Tuolumne County Sheriff's Department issued a warning about the containers. This was the first time a Burger King toy was blamed for a death. Two days later, the Consumer Product Safety Commission asked Burger King to recall the containers, which Burger King refused to do. They stated they were afraid to create anxiety for parents, as it was too soon to confirm whether the ball was responsible for the child's death, wanting to wait for an independent confirmation of the cause of death. The autopsy results had not been completed and released. Burger King spokesperson Kim Miller stated if it turned out the container was a choking hazard, they would pull them out. However, they did not want to end a promotion if there was no issue with it. The toys found in the containers were not a part of the proposed recall.

According to the Consumer Product Safety Commission, the design and size of the container made it easier for people to suffocate than with a plastic egg or a cup. It is just the right size to cover the nose and the mouth, and owing to the plastic's pliability, a child may suck the air out, creating a vacuum effect and causing the ball to become stuck to the face. Russ Rader, spokesperson for the commission, stated the more the child breathes, the tighter the ball is held in place. He claimed it is a hidden danger and is something parents could not anticipate.

On December 23, an 18-month-old Kansas girl reportedly got half of the ball stuck on her nose and mouth, but her father managed to remove it before she was injured. This resulted in Burger King agreeing to a recall after no resolution had been passed between them and the Consumer Product Safety Commission. However, the CPSC told them to wait five days—December 29—to announce the recall to allow for them to get its nationwide strategy in place. Burger King agreed, but told their stores to cease distribution of the containers.

However, when word began to leak out to the press, they released an early press release on December 27 announcing the recall, to the protest of government officials. These officials argued they needed time to distribute recall posters to more than 8,000 restaurants, a video news release, and an appearance on a national news show for CPSC chairperson Ann Brown. In addition, time was needed to avoid the period after the Christmas holiday when traveling families would be unable to watch a national newscast or pay attention to radio news broadcasts.

Brown proceeded to do the segment as planned on NBC News's Today, though changed the focus of the segment to criticize the chain for announcing the recall too soon and taking their time in determining if a recall was needed. Brown stated she was still upset by their actions a week after the incident, adding that most companies are more cooperative than this. She compared it to an incident that happened around the same time, where a Nordstrom department store's sweater's zipper was detached and became a choking hazard. The sweaters were immediately recalled.

Burger King issued a statement to parents that they should take the containers away from children ages three and younger, and should be thrown away or returned to Burger King, where they could be redeemed for a free small order of French fries. Children could keep the toy that came with the ball. According to Burger King spokesperson Charles Nicolas, more than 25 million containers were included in the recall. The container did not display any warning of a choking hazard, stating it passed all choking tests and was appropriate for all ages. Burger King stated it passed all U.S. Consumer Product Safety Commission requirements and all international safety standards.

In a Knight Ridder Washington Bureau article criticizing the recall process used by companies, which does not require companies to recall their products nor does it require they offer incentive to return recalled products, editor Ben Finley makes reference to this recall. Because the item was of negligible cost to purchasers of the kids' meals, many parents did not return the containers to Burger King. A $1 million recall campaign was initiated by Burger King, which included television advertisements  and warnings on take-out bags and tray liners from their restaurants. More than 100,000 notices and fliers were sent to health-care providers and sites frequented by Pokémon fans. Despite this, a 4-month-old boy in Indianapolis, Indiana, died of suffocation on January 25, 2000, in his crib.

Marlene Gordon, senior attorney for Burger King, stated their recall efforts were as strong or stronger for their marketing campaign. Despite the campaign, less than half of the 25 million containers were returned. According to a Burger King spokesperson, Burger King had destroyed more than 22.5 million undistributed containers and more than 500,000 returned containers by December 2000. Nancy A. Nord, acting chairperson of the commission, stated while a few came back, they assumed most people threw them away. Research was done on the recall, which showed that among customers who did not respond to a recall, 60% had thrown the containers away, which is considered an effective recall.

Burger King has stated its toy safety problems have not been fixed, as in a two-year period, they have recalled three toys intended for toddlers; however, they showed the distinction between this recall and the Pokémon recall, stating there were no injuries in these recalls.

Reaction
Following the recall, Burger King improved its testing procedures and hired a human-factors psychologist to evaluate toys and how children will use them.

Burger King has received criticism for what was described as a slow start on their part to recall the products. Chairperson Ann Brown commented that a death should be a very grave sign that there is a problem, saying that one would not want the deaths of several children before a recall is issued. After they initiated the recall campaign, Brown stated they had come around, though they had to push them to do so. In response to Burger King's abrupt announcement of the recall two days before the planned announcement, industry experts suspected this decision angered the commission and Brown, who uses high-profile media appearances to break the news of recalls. President of the Chicago-based fast food firm Technomic Ron Paul stated these kinds of things are easily forgotten after a matter of weeks, if not days. He added that most people attribute this as a toy problem, not a Burger King problem.

Equity Marketing Inc. commented that the containers met or exceeded strict federal safety guidelines and underwent rigorous safety testing by an independent, third party laboratory during and after production. While federal officials complained that Burger King refused to acknowledge the severity of the problem, Kim Miller denied this. She stated when Burger King learned of the death, the company suggested issuing a parental advisory to warn parents of the container's hazards to children under three. She added that they were trying to balance the sketchy facts they had with doing what is right for the customers, and that Burger King will always be on the side of safety. She states this is why they are willing to go out of their way to be honest with their customers; however, federal regulators would not consider such an option. Marc Schoem, director of the recall division for the Consumer Product Safety Commission, stated there needed to be some kind of drastic action to get people to stop using the product, and that only alerting parents to take the ball away from children without giving them the specifics will do no good. Ellen Mogg, assistant manager of a Burger King restaurant, stated they had not received any complaints from parents about it being a hazard; she felt they had been prompt in recalling them. This in no way says that all containers were taken away or recalled and there very well are containers from this recall still out there and owned.

News of the recall was far-reaching, being covered in newspapers around the globe including the Japanese publication Japan Weekly Monitor. In response to the recall, the Consumer Product Safety Commission announced it was examining other similar Pokémon Poké Ball toys to see if there should be a recall for them. While they had not come to a conclusion, they recommended parents keep them out of reach of children under three. The Poké Balls are made by different distributors, but look alike. One of the distributors who make retail-sold Poké Balls is Hasbro, who declined to comment on the differences between Burger King's designs; however, they stated their products are labelled for aged four and up, and meet all federal and industry standards.

The parents of the 13-month-old girl filed suit against Burger King. They won a monetary settlement from Burger King, both agreeing to keep the dollar amount confidential.

See also

Firestone and Ford tire controversy 
Taco Bell GMO recall

References

1999 controversies
1999 in the United States
2000 controversies
2000 in the United States
Pokemon container recall
Controversies in the United States
Pokémon
Toy recalls